Dorothea's wriggler, Allomicrodesmus dorotheae, is a species of fish in the monotypic genus Allomicrodesmus which is regarded by some authorities as being in the family Xenisthmidae, the wriggler family, but in the 5th edition of Fishes of the World this is treated as a synonym of the family Eleotridae, sleeper gobies. It is known from just two specimens, one from the Great Barrier Reef and the other from the Marshall Islands. The specific name honours Dorothea Bowers Schultz, the wife of Leonard Peter Schultz, who illustrated the monograph in which this species is described, although not this species.

References

Xenisthmidae
Eleotridae
Fish described in 1966